764 Naval Air Squadron (764 NAS) was a Naval Air Squadron of the Royal Navy's Fleet Air Arm. It initially formed in April 1940, at RNAS Lee-on-Solent, as an Advance Seaplane training Squadron. The Squadron moved to RAF Pembroke Dock in July 1940, and later to RNAS Lawrenny Ferry, in October 1941 and remaining there until the Squadron disbanded in November 1943. It reformed at RNAS Gosport, in February 1944, as the User Trials Unit, however, the Squadron was decommissioned for the second time in September 1945. 764 NAS reformed again, at RNAS Lossiemouth, in May 1953, where it became an Advanced Training Unit. It moved to RNAS Yeovilton in September 1953, where it received its first jet aircraft. In November 1954 the Squadron disbanded.

It reformed in February 1955, at RNAS Ford, as a Fighter Pilot Holding Unit and equipped exclusively with jets. However, in the May, the squadron also provided Westland Wyvern aircraft type conversion, for the next couple of years. In June 1957, 764 NAS moved to RNAS Lossiemouth, utilising it's satellite airfield, RNAS Milltown, and with it a change to multiple training roles: Air Weapons Training, Commanding Officers and Senior Pilots Designate Course, a Jet Fighter Pool and a Target Towing Unit. With Hawker Hunter aircraft arriving in December 1958, the squadrons primary duty was Air Warfare Instructor training. It also undertook swept wing conversion to the Hunter. From March to November 1965 a ‘B’ flight was formed at Lossiemouth, to train Airwork Limited pilots to fly Supermarine Scimitar aircraft. In July 1972, 764 Naval Air Squadron disbanded at RNAS Lossiemouth.

764 Naval Air Squadron reformed as a non-flying squadron at HMS Sultan, in October 2008, as the Initial Training Squadron, as part of the Royal Naval Air Engineering & Survival School (RNAESS), within the Defence School of Aeronautical Engineering (DSAE)to simulate a squadron environment for training of Air Engineer Officers', Air Engineering Technicians and Survival Equipment ratings.

History of 764 NAS

Advance Seaplane Training Squadron (1940 - 1943) 

764 Naval Air Squadron formed on the 8 April 1940, as an Advance Seaplane Training Squadron, at RNAS Lee-on-Solent (HMS Daedalus), situated near Lee-on-the-Solent in Hampshire. It was equipped with Walrus amphibian aircraft, Seafox and Swordfish floatplanes. When the trainees had passed the conversion course at Lee-on Solent they boarded the seaplane carrier, HMS Pegasus, for catapult training.

Lodger facilities, for a RN Air Section at RAF Pembroke Dock, a Royal Air Force Seaplane and Flying Boat station located at Pembroke Dock, Pembrokeshire, Wales, were granted to the Royal Navy and 764 NAS moved there on the 3 July 1940, leaving behind it's Seafox aircraft. From August 1940, the squadron was providing the Seaplane Flying Training Course Part II (765 NAS provided part I, where the Seafoxes ended up). Around May 1941, aircraft from 764 NAS started using Lawrenny Ferry, a Royal Naval established seaplane facility used to train Fleet Air Arm pilots in the art of flying seaplanes, which was situated 3 miles north east of Pembroke Docks on the north side of the junction of the Cresswell and Carew rivers.

The Swordfish floatplanes were withdrawn in September 1941. However, in response to Luftwaffe air raids on Pembroke Docks, in October 1941 the Air Section was withdrawn and 764 NAS moved to RNAS Lawrenny Ferry. It arrived with eight Walrus and one Swordfish floatplane, which was soon withdrawn and the Walrus was the main eaircraft operated. In July 1942, Kingfisher aircraft arrived. The need for Seaplane Training had diminished by the middle of 1943 and eventually 764 NAS disbanded at RNAS Lawrenny Ferry on 7 November 1943.

User Trials Unit (1944 - 1945) 
764 Naval Air Squadron reformed at RAF Gosport, situated in Gosport, Hampshire, England, on 19 February 1944, as the User Trials Unit. It was initially equipped with three Barracuda II and three Avenger II aircraft. On the 1 July 1944, the squadron moved to RNAS Lee-on-Solent (HMS Daedalus), located near Lee-on-the-Solent, in Hampshire and immediately a ’B’ flight was formed as a Tactician Trials flight. This flight was equipped with Firebrand aircraft.

A further detachment from 764 NAS then operated out of RNAS Machrihanish (HMS Landrail), constructed close to Campbeltown in Argyll and Bute, Scotland. It's designated role was a Torpedo Trials Flight. In September 1944, on completion of net defence trials in the river Clyde, this detachment was absorbed into 778 Naval Air Squadron. On the 1 October 1944, 'B' flight was re-designated 708 Naval Air Squadron. In June 1945, the squadron received Firefly aircraft, however, approximately three months later, 764 NAS disbanded on the 1 September 1945.

Advanced Training Squadron (1953 - 1954) 
764 Naval Air Squadron reformed, out of 'A' Flight of 766 Naval Air Squadron, on the 18 May 1953, as an Advanced Training Squadron at RNAS Lossiemouth (HMS Fulmar), located on the western edge of the town of Lossiemouth in Moray, north-east Scotland. It was equipped initially with Seafire and Firefly aircraft. The squadron provided training for Part 1 of the Operational Flying School course. 764 NAS remained at Lossiemouth for four months, relocating to RNAS Yeovilton (HMS Heron) sited a few miles north of Yeovil, in Somerset, on the 23 September 1953.

The squadron received its first jet aircraft in May 1954 when it added three Sea Hawk to operate along side its piston engined, thirteen Seafire and six Firefly aircraft. 764 NAS continued in its training role at Yeovilton for a further five months, disbanding there on the 23 November 1954.

Fighter Pilot Holding Unit (1955 - 1957) 
764 Naval Air Squadron reformed, on the 1 February 1955, at RNAS Ford, located at Ford, in West Sussex, England, as a Fighter Pilot Holding Unit. Here it was equipped with Sea Hawk, Sea Vampire and later Wyvern aircraft. 764 NAS initially worked with ten Sea Hawk and ten Sea Vampire aircraft, and these enabled the squadron to provide conversion for United States trained personnel to British standards and procedures where required, and to provide valuable flying time to Fleet Air Arm pilots prior their posting to a first-line squadron. With the Sea Vampire being dual controlled, this also enabled the squadron to provide tuition for fighter combat and ground attack techniques. In May 1955, the squadron received two Wyvern aircraft. On the 1 March 1956, 767 Naval Air Squadron, formed as a Fighter Pool Squadron from part of 764 NAS and was equipped with some of the 764 NAS Sea Hawk F.2 aircraft, however, in the same month, 764 NAS received Sea Hawk FB.3 aircraft. For nearly two years the Wyvern aircraft were being used for type conversion training, however, in February 1957, this part of the squadron became an independent Wyvern Conversion Flight.

RNAS Lossiemouth / RNAS Milltown (1957 - 1972) 
764 Naval Air Squadron moved, on the 21 June 1957, to RNAS Lossiemouth (HMS Fulmar), located on the western edge of the town of Lossiemouth in Moray, north-east Scotland. It took with it it's Sea Hawk FB.3 aircraft and in the July it received Sea Hawk FGA.4.

In December 1957, 764 NAS received two-seat Meteor trainer aircraft, however, these were soon withdrawn from the squadron, in March 1958. Later in the year, in October, it started operating Sea Hawk FGA.6 and then in the December two-seat Hunter trainer aircraft arrived. 1959 saw considerable change in the aircraft operated by 764 NAS, in February, a small number of Scimitar aircraft arrived, however, these were gone in the following May. The Sea Hawk aircraft were withdrawn by the July, therefore, by August, the squadron was equipped solely with twelve Hunter T.8 aircraft.

In March 1959, the squadron's role changed. It retained only the Commanding Officers and Senior Pilots Designates Course from before and it's new main role was Air Warfare Instructor Training, but also providing a swept wing conversion course, to the Hunter T.8 aircraft. In July 1962, 764 NAS received a number of Hunter GA.11 aircraft which replaced several Hunter T.8 aircraft. Reconnaissance cameras were fitted to three Hunter GA.11 aircraft, by Short Brothers, based in Belfast, Northern Ireland during the mid-1960's, thus becoming Hunter PR.11 aircraft. On the 26 March 1965 764B Naval Air Squadron was formed, out of the disbanding 736 Naval Air Squadron, absorbing its Scimitar aircraft. 764B had been formed to provide training to Airwork pilots to fly the Scimitar aircraft, however, it disbanded in the November having completed the training. In 1968 the main 746 NAS received Hunter T.8B and T.8C aircraft.

On the 27 July 1972, 764 Naval Air Squadron disbanded at Lossiemouth.

Initial Training Squadron (2008 - ) 
764 Naval Air Squadron reformed at HMS Sultan, in Gosport, Hampshire, on the 1 October 2008, as the Initial Training Squadron, within the Royal Naval Air Engineering & Survival School (RNAESS), simulating a squadron environment for training purposes.

Current role 
764 Initial Training Squadron, is a non-flying squadron which forms part of Royal Naval Air Engineering & Survival School (RNAESS), based at HMS Sultan, which is located at Gosport in Hampshire. The RNAESS forms part of the Defence School of Aeronautical Engineering, which provides training for aircraft engineering officers and tradesmen across the three British armed forces. The RNAESS's role is to produce Air Engineer Officers', Air Engineering Technicians and Survival Equipment ratings prepared for operational employment or further training within Front Line Commands.

Aircraft flown

The squadron has flown a number of different aircraft types, including:

Fairey Seafox I (Apr 1940 - Nov 1940)
Fairey Swordfish I (Apr 1940 - Sep 1941)
Supermarine Walrus I (Apr 1940 - Nov 1943)
Blackburn Roc (1941)
Vought Kingfisher I (Jul 1942 - Nov 1943)
Fairey Barracuda Mk II (Feb 1944 - Aug 1945)
Grumman Avenger Mk.II (Feb 1944 - Apr 1944)
Fairey Firefly I (Jun 1945 - Aug 1945)
Supermarine Seafire F Mk XVII (May 1953 - Nov 1954)
Fairey Firefly T.Mk 2 (May 1953 - Nov 1954)
Fairey Firefly T.Mk 1 (Nov 1953 - Nov 1954)
Hawker Sea Hawk F1 (May 1954 - Jun 1957)
de Havilland Sea Vampire T.22 (Jan 1955 - Jun 1957)
Hawker Sea Hawk F2 (Feb 1955 - Jun 1957)
de Havilland Sea Vampire F.20 (Jun 1955 - Feb 1956)
de Havilland Sea Vampire F.21 (Jul 1955 - Mar 1956)
Westland Wyvern S.4 (Jul 1955 - May 1957)
Hawker Sea Hawk FB 3 (Mar 1956 - Jan 1959)
Hawker Sea Hawk FGA 4 (Jul 1957 - Jul 1959)
Gloster Meteor T.7 (Dec 1957 - Mar 1958)
Hawker Sea Hawk FGA 6 (Oct 1958 - Jul 1959)
Hawker Hunter T.8 (Dec 1958 - Jul 1972)
Supermarine Scimitar F.1 (Feb 1959 - May 1959)
Hawker Hunter GA.11 (Jul 1962 - Jul 1972)
Hawker Hunter PR.11 (Jul 1962 - Jul 1972)
Hawker Hunter T.8B (1968 - Jul 1972)
Hawker Hunter T.8C (1968 - Jul 1972)

Naval Air Stations and Royal Navy Shore Establishment 

764 Naval Air Squadron operated from a number of naval air stations of the Royal Navy and a Royal Navy shore establishment:
Royal Naval Air Station LEE-ON-SOLENT (8 April 1940 - 3 July 1940)
RAF Pembroke Dock (3 July 1940 - October 1941)
Royal Naval Air Station LAWRENNY FERRY (October 1941 - 7 November 1943)
RAF Gosport / Royal Naval Air Station GOSPORT from 1 August 1945 (19 February 1944 - 1 September 1945)
Royal Naval Air Station LOSSIEMOUTH (18 May 1953 - 23 September 1953)
Royal Naval Air Station YEOVILTON (23 September 1953 - 23 November 1954)
Royal Naval Air Station FORD (1 February 1955 - 21 June 1957)
Royal Naval Air Station LOSSIEMOUTH, satellite airfield, Royal Naval Air Station MILLTOWN (21 June 1957 - 27 July 1972)
HMS Sultan (1 October 2008 - present)

Commanding Officers 

List of commanding officers of 764 Naval Air Squadron with month and year of appointment and end:

1940 - 1943
Lt-Cdr F. E. C. Judd, RN (Apr 1940-Jul 1940)
Lt-Cdr H. L. McCulloch, RN (Jul 1940-Oct 1941)
Lt-Cdr H. Wright, RN (Oct 1941-Aug 1942)
Lt-Cdr M. B. P. Francklin, DSC, RN (Aug 1942-Jan 1943)
Lt-Cdr W. J. R. MacWhriter, RN (Jan 1943-Feb 1943)
Lt D. H. Angel, RN (Feb 1943-Apr 1943)
Lt-Cdr J. E. Mansfield, RNVR (Apr 1943-Jun 1943)
Lt-Cdr J. O. B. Young, RN (Jun 1943-Nov 1943)

1944 - 1945
Lt-Cdr E. D. J. R. Whatley, RN (Feb 1944-Apr 1944)
Lt-Cdr D. L. R. Hutchinson, RNVR (Apr 1944-Nov 1944)
Lt-Cdr G. A. Donaghue, RNVR (Nov 1944-Jun 1945)
Capt D. B. L. Smith, RM (Jun 1945-Sep 1945)

1953 - 1954
Lt-Cdr P. S. Brewer, RN (May 1953-Sep 1953)
Lt-Cdr B. Bevens, DSC, RN (Sep 1953-Nov 1954)

1955 - 1972
Lt-Cdr D. F. Battinson, RN (Feb 1955-Apr 1957)
Lt-Cdr J. W. Ayres, RN (Apr 1957-Jun 1957)
Lt-Cdr D. T. McKeown, RN (Jun 1957-Apr 1959)
Lt R. M. P Carne, RN (Apr 1959-Dec 1960)
Lt-Cdr J. C. Mather, RN (Dec 1960-Jan 1963)
Lt-Cdr J. N. S. Anderson, RN (Jan 1963-Apr 1964)
Lt-Cdr G. W. G. Hunt, RN (Apr 1964-Nov 1965)
Lt-Cdr M. F. Kennett, RN (Nov 1965-May 1967)
Lt-Cdr E. Cope, RN (May 1967-Sep 1968)
Lt-Cdr R. J. Northard, RN (Sep 1968-May 1970)
Lt-Cdr R. W. Edwards, RN (May 1970-Jul 1972)

References

Citations

Bibliography 

700 series Fleet Air Arm squadrons
Military units and formations established in 1940
Military units and formations of the Royal Navy in World War II